The Order of Valour is an order of knighthood of Cameroon.

History 

It is regulated by the ordonnance N° 72/24 of 30 November 1972. It is one of the four orders of Cameroon:
 Order of Valour - 5 grades : GC, GO, Com, Off. and Knight
 Order of Merit - Grand Cordon, Commander, Officer, Knight
 Order of Agricultural Merit - Commander, Officer, Knight
 Order of Sports Merit - 1st Class, 2nd Class, 3rd Class

Insignia

The ribbon of the order is red.

Grades

The Order of Valour is subdivided into five grades of merit :

Grand Cordon 
Grand Officer 
Commander 
Officer 
Knight

References

External links

 World Medals Index, Cameroon: Order of Valour

 
Valour, Order of
Valour, Order of
Awards established in 1961
1961 establishments in Cameroon